Kreuzlingen railway station is a railway station in Kreuzlingen, in the Swiss canton of Thurgau. It sits at the junction of the standard gauge Lake line of Swiss Federal Railways and the Wil–Kreuzlingen line of THURBO. It is one of four stations within the municipality of Kreuzlingen.

Services 
 the following services stop at Kreuzlingen:

 InterRegio: hourly service over the Wil–Kreuzlingen line between Lucerne and Konstanz.
 St. Gallen S-Bahn:
 : half-hourly service over the Lake line from Schaffhausen to  via St. Gallen.
 : half-hourly service over the Wil–Kreuzlingen line between Weinfelden and Konstanz.
 : service every two hours between Weinfelden and Konstanz, with connections in Weinfelden to the IC 81.

References

External links 
 
 

Railway stations in the canton of Thurgau
Swiss Federal Railways stations
Kreuzlingen